The concept of public trust relates back to the origins of democratic government and its seminal idea that within the public lies the true power and future of a society; therefore, whatever trust citizens place in its officials must be respected.
One of the reasons that bribery is regarded as a notorious evil is that it contributes to a culture of political corruption in which public trust is eroded. Other issues related to political corruption or betrayal of public trust are lobbying, special interest groups and the public cartel.

United States

In the United States "Public Trust" is a term of art referring to any public property which belongs to the whole of the people. Initially it was used within the formation of the government to refer to politicians who achieve power by election. In the United States Constitution, all members of Congress as well as the President, and Vice President are elected seats therein. The first state constitution drafted in the United States was the Maryland Constitution of 1776, which expressed that all persons vested with the legislative and executive powers of government are public trustees.

Members of the Legislature 
In The Federalist Papers #57, Alexander Hamilton defended the concept of a House of Representatives within the new Constitution by referring to those elected representatives as holding a public trust, obtained through election, and held accountable to the people through term limits.

The Executive 
In The Federalist Papers #70 Alexander Hamilton addresses the Presidency in a discussion over having more than one executive, referring to the "magistry" being an elective office, as a public trust:

George Washington opened his farewell address in 1796 inviting the people to elect a new executive to his "important trust:"

The Constitution 

A Public Trust is the term used when referring to elected officials in the United States Constitution, to differentiate them from civil officers. For example, the No Religious Test clause of Article VI includes both civil officers (commissioned either by the President
 or the Constitution) and elected officials directly: 

Founding Father Thomas Jefferson is popularly cited for his statement in a letter to Baron von Humboldt:
 
Public trust is different from an office of trust, which is an officer. The descriptive term public is referring to public ownership of the trust.

In 1892 the United States Supreme Court found in Illinois Central Railroad Co. v. Illinois that states have public ownership of all submerged land in navigable waters, determining that states manage these lands in trust for the citizens and that no state legislature can abdicate its authority as the trustee of these resources. This added natural resources to the concept of public trust. Certain cultural resources were later also added as a public trust.

Use in the Philippines

In the Philippines, "betrayal of public trust" is one of the impeachable offenses. In Francisco, Jr. vs. Nagmamalasakit na mga Manananggol ng mga Manggagawang Pilipino, Inc., the Supreme Court of the Philippines ruled that the definition of "betrayal of public trust" is "a non-justiciable political question which is beyond the scope of its judicial power" under the Constitution. It did not prescribe which branch of government has the power to define it, but implies that Congress, which handles impeachment cases, has the power to do so.

See also
Public trust doctrine

References

External links

Social ethics
Government
Trust